Tepexco (municipality) is a town and municipality in Puebla in south-eastern Mexico.

Mayor Antolín Vital Martínez was murdered on October 24, 2017.

References

Municipalities of Puebla